is a railway station in Shibuya, Tokyo, Japan, operated jointly by East Japan Railway Company (JR East), Keio Corporation, Tokyu Corporation, and Tokyo Metro. With 2.4 million passengers on an average weekday in 2004, it is the fourth-busiest commuter rail station in Japan and the world (after Shinjuku, Ikebukuro, and Ōsaka / Umeda) handling a large amount of commuter traffic between the city center and suburbs to the south and west.

Lines

JR East
  Saikyō Line /  Shōnan–Shinjuku Line (Yamanote Freight Line) - also used by Narita Express trains
  Yamanote Line

Private railways
  Keio Inokashira Line - terminus
   - through service with Tokyo Metro Hanzomon Line
   - through service with Tokyo Metro Fukutoshin Line

Subways
   - terminus
   - through service with Tokyu Den-en-toshi Line
   - through service with Tokyu Tōyoko Line

Note that the Tokyo Metro Hanzomon Line and Fukutoshin Line are directly connected to each other (and passengers can switch from one to another without passing through ticket gates), but they are not directly connected to the Ginza Line.

Station layout

In 2013 and 2014, Shibuya station underwent major renovations as a part of a long-term site redevelopment plan. While all rail and subway lines continued to operate, some station exits and entrances were subject to change. As of March 2013, the east side of the main station was transformed due to the provision of through train services between the Tokyu Toyoko Line and the Tokyo Metro Fukutoshin Line. While much of the main station building, previously housing the Tokyu department store, had been closed and was set for demolition, the west building of the Tokyu department store continued to operate as before. The Shibuya Hikarie building, also owned by the Tokyu Group, opened in 2012 and contains department store retail, restaurants, and offices.

The Tokyo Metro Ginza Line, originally built and operated by a Tokyu keiretsu company, continues to use platforms on the third floor of the station building. The JR lines are on the second floor in a north-south orientation. The Tokyu Toyoko Line originally used parallel platforms on the second floor of the same building, but effective on 16 March 2013, the Toyoko Line moved underground to provide through service with the Tokyo Metro Fukutoshin Line. The Tokyo Metro Hanzomon Line and Tokyu Den-en-Toshi Line share platforms underground in a different part of the station. The Keio Inokashira Line uses platforms on the second floor of the Shibuya Mark City building to the west of the main station complex.

The main JR/Tokyu/Tokyo Metro complex has six exits. The  on the west side, named for the nearby statue of the dog Hachikō, and adjacent to Shibuya's famous scramble crossing, is a particularly popular meeting spot. The  on the west side leads to the Keiō Inokashira Line Shibuya Station platforms.

On , a mural by Tarō Okamoto, "The Myth of Tomorrow", depicting a human figure being hit by an atomic bomb, was unveiled in its new permanent location at the station, in the connecting passage to the Keio Inokashira Line entrance.

JR East

Platforms
There are two island platforms with a total of four tracks. One of the platforms serves the Yamanote Line and the other serves the Saikyō Line and Shōnan–Shinjuku Line.

The station was opened in 1885 with one island platform serving what is now the Yamanote Line. To alleviate congestion, a second side platform was opened to the west in July 1940 and the original platform was converted to a side platform. In March 1996, the first Saikyō Line platform was opened. It was located to the south of the Yamanote Line platforms, approximately 350m away. This platform was relocated to its current location during 30-31 May 2020. The original Yamanote Line platform was then widened during 23-24 October 2021. It was widened further during 7-8 January 2023, when the west side platform was removed from service and both directions of the Yamanote Line were recombined into a single island platform.

Tokyo Metro/Tokyu

Tokyu Den-en-toshi Line and Tokyo Metro Hanzomon Line

Platforms
On the third basement (B3F) level, a single underground island platform serves two tracks.

Tokyu Toyoko Line and Tokyo Metro Fukutoshin Line

Platforms
Two underground island platforms on the fifth basement (B5F) level serve four tracks.

Tokyo Metro Ginza Line

Platforms
As of January 2020, one island platform serves two tracks. Until December 2019, two side platforms each served one track, with one platform for terminating services and one for services departing towards Asakusa.

Due to the distance between Ginza and Hanzomon Line platforms, the transfer announcements was announced at Omote-sando station instead.

Keio Inokashira Line

Platforms
The Keio station consists of two bay platforms serving two tracks.

History
On 1 March 1885, Shibuya Station first opened as a stop on the Shinagawa Line, a predecessor of the present-day Yamanote Line. The station was later expanded to accommodate the Tamagawa Railway (1907; closed 1969), the Toyoko Line (1927), and the Teito Shibuya Line (1 August 1933; now the Inokashira Line).

Between 1925 and 1935, the legendary Akita dog named Hachikō waited for his deceased owner, appearing at the station right when his train was due for nine years.

In 1938, the station added platforms for the Tōkyō Rapid Railway, which began through service with the Ginza Line in 1939 and formally merged with it in 1941. 

In 1946, the infamous Shibuya incident, a gang fight involving hundreds of people, occurred in front of the station.

More recently, the Den-en-toshi Line (1977), the Hanzōmon Line (1978), and the Fukutoshin Line (2008) began serving the station. Between December 2008 and March 2009, piezoelectric mats were installed at Shibuya Station as a small scale test.

From 22 February 2013, station numbering was introduced on Keio lines, with Shibuya Station becoming "IN01". 

Station numbering was later introduced to the JR East platforms in 2016 with Shibuya being assigned station numbers JS19 for the Shonan-Shinjuku line, JA10 for the Saikyo line, and JY20 for the Yamanote Line. At the same time, JR East assigned its major transfer stations a 3-letter code; Shibuya was assigned the code "SBY".

On 3 January 2020, the Ginza Line platforms were shifted about 50 meters east of the old platforms. 

On 1 June 2020, the Saikyo Line platforms were shifted about 350 meters north of the old platforms, and now sits right next to the Yamanote Line platforms.

Major widening work took place on the Yamanote Line inner circle platform (Platform 2) on 23–24 October 2021. As a result, Yamanote Line service was suspended between Ikebukuro and Osaki. To accommodate for delays, an additional special train service was run between Shinagawa and Shinjuku by way of the Yamanote Freight Line.

Former Toyoko Line station

The former above-ground Tokyu Toyoko Line terminal station platforms were taken out of use after the last train service on 15 March 2013. From the start of the revised timetable on 16 March 2013, Toyoko Line services used the underground platforms 3-4 shared with Tokyo Metro Fukutoshin Line services.

Platforms
The station had four 8-car long bay platforms numbered 1 to 4, serving four tracks.

Future developments
JR East is in the process of rebuilding the station, with reconstruction work starting in earnest in fiscal year 2015.

On the platform of the Toyoko Line, which was moved to the east side of the station, Tokyu Corporation constructed a 230 meter high, 47-story commercial building "Shibuya Scramble Square", which became the tallest building in Shibuya when it opened in November 2019. Several commercial buildings connected to the station will be constructed by 2027.

Passenger statistics
In fiscal year 2013, the JR East station was used by 378,539 passengers daily (boarding passengers only), making it the fifth-busiest JR East station. Over the same fiscal year, the Keio station was used by an average of 336,957 passengers daily (exiting and entering passengers), making it the busiest station on the Inokashira Line. In fiscal 2013, the Tokyo Metro Ginza station was used by an average of 212,136 passengers daily and the Tokyo Metro Hanzōmon and Fukutoshin stations were used by an average of 731,184 passengers daily. Note that the latter statistics consider passengers who travel through Shibuya station on a through service as users of the station, even if they did not disembark at the station. In fiscal 2013, the Tokyu Toyoko Line station was used by an average of 441,266 passengers daily and the Den-en-toshi Line station was used by an average of 665,645 passengers daily. The daily passenger figures for each operator in previous years are as shown below.

 Note that JR East figures are for boarding passengers only.
 Note that the Tokyo Metro figures are for the Ginza Line station only.

Surrounding area

Surrounding the station is the commercial center of Shibuya. The Tokyu Department Store is connected to the east gate of the station and several other department stores are within walking distance.

 Shibuya Ward Office
 NHK Broadcasting Center
 NHK Hall
 Shibuya Mark City
 Shibuya 109
 Shibuya Hikarie
 Yoyogi Park
 Miyashita Park

The Shibuya River flows directly under the station, to the east and parallel to the JR tracks. Unlike most other Japanese department stores, the east block of Tokyu Department Store closed in 2013, and due for demolition as a part of the Shibuya Station redevelopment plan, did not have basement retail space due to the river passing directly underneath. An escalator in the east block of the store was constructed over the river stops a few steps above floor level to make space for machinery underneath without the need for further excavation. Rivers are deemed public space under Japanese law, so building over one is normally illegal. It is not clear why this was allowed when the store buildings were first constructed in 1933.

See also

 List of railway stations in Japan
 Transport in Greater Tokyo

References

External links

 Shibuya Station information (JR East) 
 Shibuya Station information (Tokyo Metro) 
 Shibuya Station information (Tokyu) 
 Shibuya Station information (Keio) 

Shōnan-Shinjuku Line
Saikyō Line
Yamanote Line
Tokyu Toyoko Line
Tokyu Den-en-toshi Line
Tokyo Metro Ginza Line
Tokyo Metro Hanzomon Line
Tokyo Metro Fukutoshin Line
Keio Inokashira Line
Stations of East Japan Railway Company
Stations of Tokyu Corporation
Stations of Tokyo Metro
Stations of Keio Corporation
Buildings and structures in Shibuya
Railway stations in Japan opened in 1885
Railway stations in Japan opened in 1933
Railway stations in Japan opened in 1938
Railway stations in Japan opened in 1977
Railway stations in Japan opened in 2008